Killer Not Stupid is a 2019 Singaporean-Taiwanese action comedy film directed by Jack Neo. The film tells the story about the roadtrip adventure of two men's one final mission in Taiwan before ending their careers as assassins. It is released on 5 February 2019 in Singapore and Malaysia.

Plot
Two assassins, Hornet (Jay Shih) and Mark (Na-dow) decide to end their careers with a final mission. Along the journey in Taichung, they meet several interesting characters: former classmate, Sha Bao (Gadrick Chin), a Filipino drug lord's god-daughter Talia (Amber An), and her friend Ira (Apple Chan). Action ramps up as they begin their hilarious adventure in Taiwan while completing the mission and running away from their killer's hunt.

Cast
 Jay Shih as Hornet
 Amber An as Talia
 Na-dow as Mark
 Gadrick Chin as Sha Bao
 Apple Chan as Ira
 Ryan Lian
 Lin Mei-hsiu
 Shin Lung

References

External links
 
 

2019 films
2019 action comedy films
Singaporean crime comedy films
Films set in Taiwan